N-Ethylpentedrone (also known as α-ethylaminopentiophenone, α-EAPP, α-ethylaminovalerophenone, N-ethylnorpentedrone, and NEP) is a chemical compound of the substituted cathinone class. Since the mid-2010s, NEP has been sold online as a designer drug. It is the N-ethyl analog of pentedrone.

Legal status 
NEP is illegal in Japan and China, and is classified as a '"potentially harmful substance"', thus, controlled, but not banned in Sweden.

See also 
 Pentedrone
 4-Methylethcathinone
 4'-Methyl-α-pyrrolidinohexiophenone
 α-Pyrrolidinohexiophenone
 Ethcathinone
 N-Ethylbuphedrone
 N-Ethylhexedrone
 N-Ethylheptedrone
 Ephylone

References 

Cathinones
Designer drugs